Kadrekovo (Kadrik) is a rural locality (a village) in Razdolyevsky Selsoviet, Krasnokamsky District, Bashkortostan, Russia. The population was 100 as of 2010. There are 2 streets.

Geography 
Kadrekovo is located 18 km east of Nikolo-Beryozovka (the district's administrative centre) by road. Razdolye is the nearest rural locality.

References 

Rural localities in Krasnokamsky District